Ixtapan de la Sal is a town and municipality located in the State of Mexico, Mexico. It is 60 km south of Toluca, the state's  capital, and 120 km south of Mexico City by the Federal Road 55. The word Ixtapan comes from Nahuatl. There are two theories as to the origin of the name. The phrase  is Spanish for 'of salt'.

There are two rivers in Ixtapan de la Sal. They are the Salado river from the east with a year-round current, and the Salitre river from the northwest with a seasonal current. An aqueduct also passes through the city. Most relevant to tourists is the carbonated water of La Laguna Verde, a spring which filters from the subsoil sprouting naturally in form of water eruptions.

On January 22, 1981, Ixtapan de la Sal officially became a city. In 1996, it was integrated into the 100 Colonial Cities program, a tourist program collecting the oldest and most important Mexican cities in a list.

Tourism 

Tourism is the main economic activity in Ixtapan de la Sal. The natural hot water springs attract thousands of visitors every year. Ixtapan is considered one of the primary tourist destinations in the State of Mexico. Some internationally known hotel chains have locations there, most often placed on or right next to a thermal spring. The best known of these hotel spas are the famous Ixtapan Spa Hotel and Golf Resort, Marriott Ixtapan de la Sal, and Hotel Rancho San Diego Grand Spa Resort. These resorts offer guests baths in volcanically heated waters, massages, beauty treatments and other services.

The park also has an expanse of green area with a small train that tours it.

A point of interest is the Arturo San Roman boulevard; within a few miles' stretch are several large sculptures. The first one at the entrance of the town is the Iztapancihuatl (goddess from thermal water), then, there is a water fountain depicting Diana Cazadora and finally the sculpture honoring the Independence InsurgentsOn.

A wonder of nature, only fifteen kilometers away from the town, Las Grutas de la Estrella are caverns that have been formed by the dissolving of limestone by groundwater seeping from the Chontalcuatlan and San Jeronimo rivers. These caverns are filled with stalactites and stalagmites of various colors.

In September 2015, the town received recognition for the federal program .

The municipality
As municipal seat, the town of Ixtapan de la Sal has governing jurisdiction over the following communities: Ahuacatitlán, Barrio Santa Ana, Coaxusco, Colonia Juárez, Colonia la Joya Tres de Mayo Lindavista, El Arenal de las Ollas, El Colorín, El Refugio, El Rincón de Dios Yerbas Buenas, El Salitre, Ixtamil, La Falda, Llano de la Unión, Llano de San Diego, Los Naranjos, Malinaltenango (Manila), Mesón Nuevo, Plan de San Miguel, Portezuelos Dos, Portezuelos Uno (San Andrés), Puerta Grande (Puerta de los Fresnos), Rancho San Diego, San Alejo, San Diego Alcalá (San Diego), San José del Arenal (El Arenal), San Miguel Laderas (San Miguel), San Pedro Tlacochaca, Santa Ana Xochuca, Tecomatepec (San Pedro Tecomatepec), Tlacochaca, Yautepec, and Yerbas Buenas.

Demographic information
The population of the municipality according to the 2005 census is 30,073. 51% of the population lives in the town of Ixtapan de la Sal itself and 48.1% live in the surrounding municipality.

There are currently 114 schools with about 566 teachers. The illiteracy rate is 12.6%. 48.8% of the population is economically active.

Government

The government is formed by:
 Municipal president
 Attorney general
 10 deputies

The municipality also has a secretary, director of municipal public works, municipal administrator, director of municipal development, municipal security chief, municipal slaughterhouse administrator, chief of human and material resources, director of sports, administrator of natural springs, director of water works and sanitation and director of civil protection.

These authorities have jurisdiction over both the town and municipality of Ixtapan de la Sal.

In each community belonging to the municipality, three representatives are chosen to help in the government and to represent their neighbors. In each community, there are also two or three of these representatives that help with security and with some government projects.

History

In the year 1394, a group of indigenous people came from the Pacific coast. They wanted to get to Tenochtitlan in order to attend the crowning of the emperor. On their way to their destination, these Pacific people established in Ixtapan de la Sal where they formed communities. There they noticed that once the geothermally heated water was evaporated naturally in the sunlight, salt was formed. This amazed them because at that time, salt was a very precious item. When the emperor found out about this discovery, he also ordered men and women to move there, which led to the foundation of Ixtapan de la Sal.

At the time of the Spanish conquest, Hernán Cortés sent Andrés de Tapia to conquer Ixtapan de la Sal. The first priest who came to Ixtapan was Juan Guichen de Leyva. Evangelization was carried out by Franciscans who came here after 1543. Tradition states that 13 monks came to Ixtapan de la Sal to convert the Indians by associating Christ with the local deity associated with storms.

In 1822, Ixtapan de la Sal became a municipality of the state of Mexico. In 1825, the first elections to select the municipal council took place on Sunday, December 3 of the same year.  On August 9 and 10, 1912, the population of Ixtapan de la Sal was attacked by "pseudo-Zapatistas", followers of Zapata's ideology. The invaders were led by Andres Ruiz and Francisco B. Pacheco. On August 1, 1918, by council agreement, a day of local mourning was declared – August 10 each year.

Geographical information

Ixtapan borders the municipalities of Coatepec Harinas to the northwest, Villa Guerrero to the northeast, and Zumpahuacán to the east, the municipality of Tonatico and the state of Guerrero to the south and the municipality of Zacualpan to the west.

The climate in Ixtapan de la Sal is predominately cool, semi-arid with rains in the summer.

There is a great variety of plant species in Ixtapan de la Sal, among which are found watercress, borage, chamomile, pine, cedar, ash tree, jacaranda, avocado, date palms, reeds, rue, arnico, holm oak, oyamel fir, aile, casuarina, Mexican fig tree, cowslip, tree morning glory, liquorice, tepeguaj and pirul. It has a wide variety of animals which includes rabbits, squirrels, sparrowhawks, quails, iguanas, badgers, coyotes, wild cats, skunks, ferrets, foxes, American badgers, gophers, opossums, mockingbirds and ringtails, but insects, birds and reptiles can also be found.

Traditions

Popular celebrations
On the second Friday of Lent the annual religious celebration in honor to the Lord of Forgiveness is celebrated.

On August 15, a religious festival in honor of the Assumption of Mary takes place.

Traditions

As part of the ritual to mourn the dead, for nine days after the passing of a loved one, prayers are offered for the deceased.  On the ninth day, a wooden cross that has been laid on the ground is raised upright and carried to the tomb to be placed there permanently.

Another tradition practiced in Ixtapan is the tianguis, which is an open-street market held every Sunday. Some people still practice  (bartering) there.

Dances
The most popular is a dance parade called Apaches, participated in by local townspeople on September 15 and 16 in celebration of the Mexican War of Independence.

Students from the local schools and the school for the arts often perform dance routines in the town square or other venues in celebration of Mother's Day, Teacher's Day and other festivities.

 is performed by church members in the church's court during religious festivities.

 is sometimes held as a dance parade or 'pilgrimage' to or from a shrine to honor the patron saint of said shrine.

Music
Its members play musical instruments without formal music education.

Arts and crafts

The most prominent are the wooden  and pottery.

References

Populated places in the State of Mexico
Municipalities of the State of Mexico
Pueblos Mágicos